Neusticurus rudis, the red neusticurus, is a species of lizard in the family Gymnophthalmidae. It is found in Guyana and Venezuela.

References

Neusticurus
Reptiles of Guyana
Reptiles of Venezuela
Reptiles described in 1900
Taxa named by George Albert Boulenger